The Mineworkers Union of Namibia (MUN) is one of the most powerful of Namibia's trade unions. It plays a leading public role in the Namibian political space and is an ally of the ruling South West Africa People's Organization (SWAPO) government. MUN was established in 1986. It is affiliated with the National Union of Namibian Workers (NUNW) national trade union center and had about 8,000 members .

Strikes
MUN supported the 2008 Skorpion Zinc Strike, accusing Skorpion Zinc of practising racial discrimination and of negotiating in bad faith.

Notable members
 John Shaetonhodi, union president 1986–1995, later deputy labour minister
 Bernhardt Esau, secretary general of NUNW, a national trade union center, later fisheries minister
 Asser Kuveri Kapere, President from 1987-1991
 Peter Naholo, Secretary General from 1993-2001
 Ben Ulenga
 Rudolf Isaaks 1996

References

Trade unions in Namibia
SWAPO
Mining in Namibia
Mining trade unions
Trade unions established in 1986
1986 establishments in South West Africa